Tillandsia rodrigueziana is a species in the genus Tillandsia. This species is native to Mexico, El Salvador, Nicaragua, Guatemala, and Honduras.

Cultivars
 Tillandsia 'Tiki Torch'

References

rodrigueziana
Flora of Central America
Flora of Mexico
Plants described in 1919
Epiphytes